Marvin Andrews CM (born 22 December 1975) is a Trinidadian former professional footballer who played as a centre back.

Andrews's career includes spells at Livingston, with whom he won the Scottish League Cup in 2004, and Rangers, where he won the double of the League Cup and the Scottish Premier League title in 2005. Most recently he played for Scottish League Two club Clyde.

Between 1996 and 2006 Andrews was a regular for the Trinidad and Tobago national football team, winning 99 caps up to that point. He had stated that he wished for another callup in future, and earned his 100th cap in a 3–2 defeat to Costa Rica in a FIFA World Cup qualifying match on 6 June 2009.

Club career 
Andrews is tall, strong and very good in the air, as he has proven with a few goals over the years. Before moving to Scotland, he played with Carib F.C. of Trinidad.

Raith Rovers sold Andrews for around £50,000 in a multi-player deal, and he signed for Livingston on 28 September 2000. He was voted Raith Rovers' "Player of the Day" in the 1999–00 season, and also Livingston's "Player of the Year" for the 2003–04 season. On 14 March 2004, Andrews picked up his first major medal when Livingston won the 2003-04 Scottish League Cup by beating Hibernian 2–0 with goals by Derek Lilley and Jamie McAllister.

Andrews signed a two-year deal with Rangers in May 2004 and at the end of his first season with Rangers he scooped the Rangers Players' Player of the Year award, the club also won the Scottish Premier League title on the last day of the season. He was released by Rangers at the end of the 2005–06 season and was a free agent for a short while, before being re-signed by his former club Raith Rovers on 4 October 2006.

In May 2008, Andrews left Raith by mutual consent. He appeared for them as a trialist a little less than a year later, playing for the full 90 minutes in a 1–0 win over East Fife. Andrews stated that he wished to remain with Rovers for the rest of the season and signed up yet again with Raith Rovers on 11 March 2009. In July 2009, Andrews signed for SPL club Hamilton Academical.

On 7 December 2009, Dumfries club Queen of the South announced Andrews had signed on a one-month loan as cover for the suspended David Lilley and Stephen McKenna. Manager Gordon Chisholm gave Andrews his Queens debut on 12 December in the 2–1 win away to Morton. With bad weather causing a series of fixture postponements at Palmerston Park, Andrews played only one other game for Queens during the loan period, in the 2–2 draw away at Partick Thistle. However Andrews returned to QoS by signing a six-month deal on 29 January 2010. Andrews was released by Queens at the end of the 2009–10 season.

He joined Wrexham in August 2010 on a short term contract for the 2010–11 season in the Conference Premier. At the end of 2011, he left Wrexham and joined Scottish Junior Football Association, West Region club Kirkintilloch Rob Roy.

At the start of 2013, he joined Albion Rovers in the Second Division. In July 2013, it was confirmed that he had signed for Forfar Athletic.

On 10 August 2014, Andrews made his debut for League Two side Elgin City. Andrews set up Craig Gunn to score the only goal of the game, as Elgin beat East Fife 1–0. After three games as a trialist, including two man of the match performances and one goal against Annan Athletic, Andrews signed a one-year deal with Elgin. He is quoted as saying "It’s a very, very nice club with great supporters, and the team plays very attractive football." He scored his second goal for Elgin in a 5-4 defeat to Bo'ness United F.C. in the Scottish Cup.

In January 2015, Andrews joined Montrose, and scored his first goal for the club in a 3-3 draw with Berwick Rangers. On 16 May 2015, he scored as Montrose came from behind to defeat Highland Football League champions Brora Rangers in a play-off to maintain their status in the SPFL. In September 2015, at the age of 39, Andrews signed for Clyde, playing in Scottish League Two. He scored on his debut against former club Elgin City. After playing in just 13 League matches, Marvin was released by the club at the end of the 2015–16 season.

International career 
Andrews was a key player for the Trinidad and Tobago national team. Having made his international début in 1996, Andrews has joined Angus Eve and Stern John in earning 100 caps for his country. He was a regular member of the national team during their qualification process for the 2006 FIFA World Cup, but a knee injury sustained prior to the opening match against Sweden virtually ruled him out of the tournament. Brent Sancho took his place in the team alongside Dennis Lawrence.

Personal life 
A devout Christian, Andrews also practices faith healing at the "Zion Praise Centre International", a church based in Kirkcaldy which is described as being Pentecostal. Andrews claims his faith was largely inspired by former Livingston teammate Javier Sánchez Broto.

In the 2004–05 season (his first season with Rangers) he injured the cruciate ligament in his knee while playing. The injury was supposed to keep him off the field for months but Marvin Andrews was only off for one Scottish League Cup match and was back the next week as he believed God would keep him fit, a move which worried medical staff and supporters alike. Andrews' leg and form held up for the rest of the season, which saw his first SPL medal but the same injury eventually caught up with him, ruling him out of Trinidad And Tobago's World Cup 2006 campaign. When Andrews scored for Rangers, or won the Man of the Match at Ibrox Stadium, the song "I'm a Believer" by The Monkees was played.

In February 2006, Andrews controversially labelled homosexuals as "an abomination" and said, "There is a demon in their spirits, their spirits are ill. But God can help them through his church and anyone who doubts this can check the Bible". In an interview with The Guardian in October 2007, he sought to clarify his beliefs, claiming that what was written in the 2006 article was "a misquote and it was taken out of context" and saying that he did not have anything against homosexuals themselves, rather that it was homosexual acts that he believed were against God's will.

Awards
As a member of the Trinidad and Tobago squad that competed at the 2006 FIFA World Cup in Germany, Andrews was awarded the Chaconia Medal (Gold Class), the second highest state decoration of Trinidad and Tobago.

Career statistics

Club

International goals 
Scores and results list Trinidad and Tobago's goal tally first, score column indicates score after each Andrews goal.

Honours 
Livingston
 Scottish First Division: 2000–01
 Scottish League Cup: 2004

Rangers
 Scottish Premier League: 2004–05
 Scottish League Cup: 2005

Raith Rovers
 Scottish Second Division: 2008–09

Trinidad and Tobago
Caribbean Cup: 1999, 2001

Individual
 Scottish Premier League Player of the Month: August 2001
 Chaconia Medal, Gold Class: 2006

See also 
 List of men's footballers with 100 or more international caps

References

External links 

1975 births
Living people
Association football central defenders
Association football defenders
Raith Rovers F.C. players
Livingston F.C. players
Rangers F.C. players
Hamilton Academical F.C. players
Queen of the South F.C. players
Albion Rovers F.C. players
Forfar Athletic F.C. players
Wrexham A.F.C. players
Clyde F.C. players
Montrose F.C. players
Elgin City F.C. players
Trinidad and Tobago Christians
Trinidad and Tobago footballers
Trinidad and Tobago international footballers
Trinidad and Tobago expatriate footballers
2006 FIFA World Cup players
1998 CONCACAF Gold Cup players
2000 CONCACAF Gold Cup players
2002 CONCACAF Gold Cup players
2005 CONCACAF Gold Cup players
Scottish Premier League players
Scottish Football League players
San Juan Jabloteh F.C. players
Expatriate footballers in Scotland
FIFA Century Club
National League (English football) players
Expatriate footballers in Wales
Kirkintilloch Rob Roy F.C. players
Recipients of the Chaconia Medal
Trinidad and Tobago expatriate sportspeople in Scotland
Trinidad and Tobago expatriate sportspeople in Wales
Scottish Professional Football League players